The River Junction AVA is an American Viticultural Area located in both San Joaquin County and Stanislaus County, California.  West of the city of Modesto, the wine region is located at the confluence of the San Joaquin River and the Stanislaus River.  The AVA was created as a result of a petition by McManis Family Vineyards, the only commercial winery in the appellation.  River Junction AVA is cooler than surrounding areas of the Central Valley, and is the only place in the valley where high concentrations of fine sandy loam are to be found.  90% of the vineyard land planted in the AVA is planted with Chardonnay grapes.

References

American Viticultural Areas
American Viticultural Areas of California
Geography of San Joaquin County, California
Geography of Stanislaus County, California
2001 establishments in California